is a Japanese professional boxer and former OPBF super bantamweight champion. He trained under Satoshi Koguchi at Koguchi Boxing Gym in Tokyo. Wake was scouted early by Koguchi, who spotted his talent and persuaded him to move to Tokyo and pursue a boxing career.  He has since changed boxing gym and now trains at Flare boxing gym.  A southpaw, Wake is dubbed a "sharp shooter" due to his accuracy and speed in the ring.

Professional career
Wake made his professional debut in October 2006, defeating his opponent by KO in the first round.  He then continued his way up the professional circuit to eventually land his first title shot, against undefeated champion, Yukinori Oguni, in March 2013. Wake was considered a big underdog for the fight, traveling to Kobe to face the champion.  Wake put on a clinic in front of a stunned audience, even knocking Oguni down in the 2nd.  He then proceeded to take his opponent apart with precision jabs and his signature straight left.

Oguni's corner threw in the towel in the 10th, having seen their fighter take enough punishment.  Wake made his first title defense against Eita Kikuchi in June 2013.  He knocked down Kikuchi in the 2nd round and eventually won by TKO in the 9th.

In the third defence of his OPBF title Wake defeated Filipino fighter Jovy Katsumata by TKO before following that up by beating Korean fighter Jaesung Lee in the 4th defence of his title. The contest with Lee was made noteworthy by the fact Wake sent the Korean fighter out of the ring before stopping him in the following round, the 10th.

Wake challenged Jonathan Guzman for the IBF super bantam weight title in July 2016 but lost by TKO in the 9th round. He was dropped several times throughout the fight.  

After the defeat, he changed trainers and gym. He won his next fight by TKO in Tokyo.

Personal life
Wake enjoys eating yakiniku and driving in his free time. He keeps a personal blog of his life at http://ameblo.jp/cool0224/.

References

External links

1987 births
Living people
Japanese male boxers
Super-bantamweight boxers
Sportspeople from Okayama